Chilliwack-Sumas was a provincial electoral district for the Legislative Assembly of British Columbia, Canada from 2001 to 2009.

Demographics

Geography

1999 Redistribution
Changes from Chilliwack to Chilliwack-Sumas include:
Removal of half of the City of Chilliwack
Removal of all area east of the City of Chilliwack

Changes from other electoral district to Chilliwack-Sumas
Inclusion of the southwestern portion of the City of Abbotsford
Inclusion of Sumas Mountain

Member of Legislative Assembly 
Its MLA is Hon. John Les, a former mayor of Chilliwack. He was first elected in 2001. He represents the British Columbia Liberal Party. Mr. Les was appointed Minister of Small Business and Economic Development on Jan. 26, 2004. He is seeking re-election in the newly created Chilliwack riding for the 2009 election.

Election results 

|-

|-

|NDP
|Christine Muise
|align="right"|2,434
|align="right"|12.88%
|align="right"|
|align="right"|$4,360

External links 
BC Stats - 2001 (pdf)
Results of 2001 election (pdf)
2001 Expenditures (pdf)
Website of the Legislative Assembly of British Columbia

Former provincial electoral districts of British Columbia
Politics of Chilliwack